The Copa Federación Venezolana de Ciclismo (also known as the  Copa Ciudad de Valencia) is an elite men's and women's professional one-day road bicycle race held in Venezuela and is currently rated by the UCI as a 1.2 race.

References 

Cycle races in Venezuela
Women's road bicycle races
UCI America Tour races